Ghetto Blaster is a studio album by American hip hop producer Push Button Objects. It was released on Chocolate Industries in 2003. It is the follow-up to Dirty Dozen.

Critical reception

Mark Pytlik of AllMusic gave the album 4 stars out of 5, calling it "an admirable reinvention that should indoctrinate [Edgar] Farinas into the new school of bleeding-edge underground hip-hop producers." Rollie Pemberton of Pitchfork gave the album a 7.2 out of 10, saying: "Surrounded by the highly polished sample fests of RJD2 and the ridiculously technical chop-a-thons of Prefuse 73, Push Button Objects is lost in the fold, regardless of his clear production prowess." Todd Hutlock of Stylus Magazine gave the album a grade of C+, writing: "Mostly, I found myself wishing that Farinas would just make separate rap and instrumental albums next time out."

It was ranked at number 19 on the CMJ "Hip-Hop 2003" chart.

Track listing

References

External links
 

2003 albums
Chocolate Industries albums
Electronic albums by American artists
Hip hop albums by American artists